Gholam-Ali Soleimani ( (born 15 June 1946 in Amol) is a businessman, entrepreneur, manager, member of the Iran Chamber of Commerce, Industries, Mines & Agriculture and consultant minister of Ministry of Industries and Business Iran in Iran Development of non-oil exports. He is said to be the father of Iran's modern industry.
He is the CEO of the Solico Group, which currently consists of more than 30 company as Kalleh Dairy. In 2015, Soleiman was selected as one of the ten economic elites in the World of Islamic Economy, winning the Muslim World Biz award.

References

1946 births
Living people
Iranian businesspeople
People from Amol